John Steven Bassam, Baron Bassam of Brighton,  (born 11 June 1953) is a British Labour and Co-operative politician and a member of the House of Lords.

Background
Bassam grew up on a council estate in Great Bentley, Essex and went to the local boys secondary modern school in Pathfield Road, now Clacton Coastal Academy in Clacton-on-Sea. He then went to study at the universities of Sussex and Kent, where he received a Master's in social work. Bassam then began his career as a social worker at Camden London Borough Council. He moved on to other roles in local government, serving as an assistant secretary at the Association of Metropolitan Authorities, later the Local Government Association.

Bassam was also a squatter and a committed far left anarchist during his early years in Brighton, where he founded a squatters union which campaigned for the rights of squatters to occupy empty properties and improve the conditions of the squats.

In January 1976, Bassam led the opposition to the eviction of a family from a house on West Hill Road, saying "We will gladly vacate the premises if we are assured that the family at the top of the housing list is given the house to live in." 

Interviewed in 2013, he claimed that he would not support anyone who occupies someone else's home.

Political career
Bassam became involved in local politics and was elected a Brighton councillor. He rose to become Leader of Brighton, then Brighton and Hove Council, from 1987 until 1999. He stood unsuccessfully for Parliament in Brighton Kemptown at the 1987 general election against the Conservative MP Andrew Bowden.

On 3 November 1997, he was created a life peer as Baron Bassam of Brighton, of Brighton in the County of East Sussex, and was introduced in the House of Lords on 18 November, sitting on the Labour benches.

Bassam was promoted to the frontbenches as Parliamentary Under-Secretary of State for the Home Office in 1999. In 2001, he was appointed a Lord-in-waiting (Government whip in the Lords). He served in that role and as Government spokesman for the Home Office until 2008. During the same period he served at various times as Government spokesman for a number of other departments: Lord Chancellor's Department 2001–04, Cabinet Office 2001–07, Office of the Deputy Prime Minister (subsequently Communities and Local Government) 2002–04, 2005–07, 2008, Attorney General's Office 2005–08, Transport 2007–08, Culture, Media and Sport 2008. 

In 2008, Gordon Brown promoted him to the role of Labour Chief Whip, and therefore Government Chief Whip and Captain of the Honourable Corps of Gentlemen-at-Arms. On 8 July 2009 he was made a Privy Councillor. When Labour moved into Opposition in 2010, he became Opposition Chief Whip.

In December 2011 and January 2012, Bassam engaged in a vigorous debate on Twitter with Brighton and Hove Greens about budget cuts by the council's Green administration.

2017 expenses scandal
In December 2017 he was accused of over-claiming expenses. He agreed to stand down as Labour's Chief Whip in the House of Lords following the appointment of a successor. He also referred himself to the House of Lords Commissioner for Standards over the accusations.

The Commissioner found that Bassam had claimed both the Lords allowance and the Lords Office Holders Allowance for travel costs, but had done so mistakenly rather than dishonestly. The Committee for Privileges and Conduct asked that Bassam repay £15,737 in over-claimed travel allowance and write a letter of apology to the Committee. Bassam stated he would resign as chief whip once a replacement had been elected.

References

External links

|-

|-

|-

1953 births
Living people
Alumni of the University of Kent
Alumni of the University of Sussex
Councillors in East Sussex
English social workers
Honourable Corps of Gentlemen at Arms
Labour Co-operative life peers
Labour Party (UK) Baronesses- and Lords-in-Waiting
Leaders of local authorities of England
Members of the Privy Council of the United Kingdom
Life peers created by Elizabeth II
People from Great Bentley
20th-century squatters